Cytochrome P450, family 25, also known as CYP25, is a nematoda cytochrome P450 monooxygenase family. The first gene identified in this family is the CYP25A1 from the Caenorhabditis elegans.

References 

Animal genes
25
Protein families